Chicago Musical Instruments Co. (CMI) was a musical instrument distributor, which at times had controlling interests in Gibson Guitars (1944 to 1969), Standel, Lowrey, F. E. Olds (brass instruments), William Lewis & Son Co. (stringed instruments), Krauth & Beninghoften, L.D. Heater Music Company, Epiphone Guitars, Selmer UK, and other musical instrument brands.

History

CMI was established in 1920 by Maurice H. Berlin, founder and president. In 1944, CMI took over controlling interests and marketing of the Gibson Guitar Company, then known as Gibson Inc. CMI expanded Gibson's Kalamazoo, MI, plant at 225 Parsons Street by 15,000 square feet in 1945, and changed the logo on Gibson headstocks in 1947. In 1949 CMI appointed as president of Gibson Ted McCarty, who would lead Gibson until 1966, overseeing many classic Gibson guitar designs, such as the Les Paul, the ES-335, the SG, and others.

CMI acquired F. E. Olds and Son brass instruments shortly after World War II.

CMI acquired Epiphone Guitars, a former competitor of Gibson's, in 1957. The Epiphone name brand came to be used largely for marketing budget versions of classic Gibson designs, originally made in the Kalamazoo plant but since the 1970s in Asia.

In 1969, ECL, a South American beer and cement company, acquired a majority of CMI shares, and the two companies merged in July of that year. The new company was renamed Norlin Corp (a portmanteau of the names Norton Stevens of ECL and Arnold Berlin of CMI; Arnold Berlin, Maurice' son, and Norton Stevens were friends and classmates at the Harvard Business School)

See also 
 Gibson Kalamazoo Electric Guitar

References

Further reading 
 
 NAMM Oral History Program relating: "CMI" (Chicago Musical Instruments)
 NAMM Oral History Program relating: "Norlin Corporation"

Musical instrument manufacturing companies of the United States
Manufacturing companies established in 1920
1920 establishments in Illinois
Manufacturing companies disestablished in 1969
1969 disestablishments in Illinois
American companies disestablished in 1969